Obanos is a town and municipality located in the province and autonomous community of Navarre, northern Spain.

Demography
From:INE Archiv

References

External links 
 OBANOS in the Bernardo Estornés Lasa - Auñamendi Encyclopedia (Euskomedia Fundazioa) 

Municipalities in Navarre